Banda Lok Sabha Constituency is one of the 80 parliamentary constituency in Uttar Pradesh state in northern India.

Assembly segments
Banda Lok Sabha constituency comprises five Vidhan Sabha (legislative assembly) segments. These are:

Members of Parliament

Election results

See also
 Banda
 List of Constituencies of the Lok Sabha

References

External links
 Banda Parliamentary Constituency results
 Banda lok sabha constituency election 2019 result

Lok Sabha constituencies in Uttar Pradesh
Banda district, India